Yeşildere (literally "green stream" in Turkish) may refer to the following places in Turkey:

 Yeşildere, Acıpayam
 Yeşildere, Amasya, a village in the district of Amasya, Amasya Province
 Yeşildere, Buldan
 Yeşildere, Çorum
 Yeşildere, Horasan
 Yeşildere, Karacabey
 Yeşildere, Karaman, a town in the district of Karaman, Karaman Province
 Yeşildere, Kovancılar
 Yeşildere, Kuyucak, a village in the district of Kuyucak, Aydın Province